Jackson Greenberg is an American film and television composer based in Los Angeles. He is best known for scoring Audible, DMX: Don't Try to Understand, Maybe This Year, Cartel Land and for writing the theme song to the Netflix series Explained.

Life and career
Jackson was born in Philadelphia, Pennsylvania. He studied music at Princeton University, the Royal College of Music in London, and the University of Southern California Scoring for Motion Picture and Television program. He was selected as a Sundance Lab Composer Fellow in 2017.

Filmography

 2022 – Boys In Blue (4 Episodes)
 2022 – Over/Under
 2022 – You and Me This Summer
 2021 – Let Me Be Me
 2021 – DMX: Don't Try to Understand
 2021 – Daddy Isn't Here Right Now
 2021 – Audible
 2019-2021 – Kids Behind Bars: Life or Parole (19 episodes)
 2020 – Whose Vote Counts, Explained (3 episodes)
 2019-2020 – Dating Around (12 episodes)
 2020 – AKA Jane Roe
 2019 – Maybe This Year
 2019 – Liberation Heroes: The Last Eyewitnesses
 2018 – Afflicted (6 episodes)
 2017 – Hot Girls Wanted: Turned On (6 episodes)
 2017 – City of Ghosts

 2016 – Kate & Lily
 2015 – Cartel Land
 2014 – Blackout
 2013 – Black Dog
 2013 – Hear Me Roar
 2013 – The Cynicism of Harvey Kay
 2013 – The Ring of Rimachi
 2013 – Imaginary Anonymous
 2013 – Herman (3 episodes)
 2012 – Color My World
 2011 – Dear Mother
 2011 – Israel Inside: How a Small Nation Makes a Big Difference
 2011 – I'm Here. A Requiem for the Kids.

Awards and nominations

References

External links
 
 

Living people
American film score composers
American television composers
American male film score composers
Male television composers
Year of birth missing (living people)